Petru Constantin Luhan (born 19 March 1977) is a Romanian politician, who since the 2009 election has been a Member of the European Parliament for Romania, representing the Democratic Liberal Party (PDL). He is a member of the Regional Development Committee and vice-president of EPP Young Members in the European Parliament.

Education
Luhan studied economics at Osnabrück University in Germany and also had study exchanges in the United States and Australia.

Parliamentary Activities
 Regional Development Committee
 Awarded MEP of the Year in 2013 in the Health Category

References

Living people
1977 births
People from Suceava County
Democratic Liberal Party (Romania) politicians
MEPs for Romania 2009–2014
Osnabrück University alumni